Booker T. Washington Park is a Texas state park, located at Comanche Crossing, Limestone County, Texas, near Mexia.

History 
It was dedicated in 1898 for the annual celebration of Juneteenth.
2.5 miles south of this site, slaves first heard of their emancipation.
There was a Tabernacle for church services, and Pavillion for consessions, and dancing.

In 1981, three teens drowned, while detained by sheriffs.

References

External links 
 Limestone County Nineteenth of June Organization

State parks of Texas
Booker T. Washington